Unreal may  refer to:

Books and TV
 Unreal (short story collection), a 1985 book of short stories by Paul Jennings
 Unreal (TV series), a 2015 television drama series on Lifetime

Computing and games
 Unreal (video game series), various computer games set in the Unreal universe
Unreal (1998 video game), first-person shooter computer game from the series
 Unreal (1990 video game), a 1990 game published by Ubisoft
 Unreal Engine, a widely used game engine upon which the Unreal games among others are built
 Unreal (demo), a 1992 computer programming demo by Future Crew
 UnrealIRCd, an Internet Relay Chat daemon

Music

Albums
 Unreal (End of You album), 2006 
 Unreal (Flumpool album), 2008
 UnReal (My Ticket Home album), 2017
 Unreal!!!, by Ray Stevens, 1970
 Unreal, by Bloodstone, 1973

Songs
 "Unreal" (song), by Ill Niño, 2002
 "Unreal", by Dreamworld, 1995
 "Unreal", by Gord Bamford from Country Junkie, 2013
 "Unreal", by Soil from Scars, 2001
 "Unreal", by Unkle from Psyence Fiction'', 1998

See also